Extrema is a municipality in the state of Minas Gerais in the Southeast region of Brazil.

The municipality contains part of the  Fernão Dias Environmental Protection Area, created in 1997.

See also
List of municipalities in Minas Gerais

References

Municipalities in Minas Gerais